Best of Bee Gees Vol. 2 is a compilation album of hits by the Bee Gees released in 1973. The album, briefly revived on CD in the late 1980s, went out of print, but was reissued by Rhino in November 2008.

Whereas the original Best of Bee Gees had focused on songs that had been major hits for the group in America and/or the United Kingdom up to 1969, this follow-up collection featured 1969–72 chart hits and also album tracks from their late-1960s albums Horizontal, Idea and Odessa, plus "Morning of My Life" – which featured on the soundtrack of the 1971 film Melody –  and Robin Gibb's big 1969 non-US solo hit Saved by the Bell. The album featured nothing from Bee Gees' 1st, which had already been represented by five tracks on the earlier compilation.

The front cover featured a group photograph from the same photoshoot that had been sourced for the front cover of their Life in a Tin Can album released earlier in 1973, despite the fact that nothing from that album appeared on this compilation.

Track listing

Personnel
Barry Gibb - vocals, rhythm guitar except on 7
Robin Gibb - vocals, organ, drum machine except on 2 and 10 guitar on 7
Maurice Gibb - bass, piano, vocals

Additional personnel

Vince Melouney - lead guitar on 6 and 11
Colin Petersen - drums on 2, 4, 6, 10 and 11
Geoff Bridgford - drums on 1, 3, 8, 9, 13 and 14
Alan Kendall - lead guitar on 1, 3, 5, 12 and 14
Clem Cattini - drums on 12
Bill Shepherd (conductor) - orchestral arrangement
Kenny Clayton - orchestral arrangement on 7

Alternate versions

North America
The U.S. (RSO SO 875) and Canadian (RSO 2394 112) releases of this album included the song "Wouldn't I Be Someone" from the Bee Gees' unreleased album A Kick In The Head Is Worth Eight In The Pants and rearranged the tracks in the following order:

Side 1
 "Wouldn't I Be Someone"
 "I.O.I.O." 
 "My World
 "Saved By The Bell 
 "Don't Forget To Remember
 "And The Sun Will Shine
 "Run To Me
 "Man For All Seasons

Side 2  
 "How Can You Mend A Broken Heart"
 "Don't Want To Live Inside Myself"
 "Melody Fair"
 "Let There Be Love"
 "Lonely Days" 
 "Morning Of My Life"
 "Alive"

Germany
The German version of Best of Bee Gees Vol. 2 on Polydor (Stereo Vinyl 2480 030, music cassette 3194033) featured many different tracks, including solo work by all the three brothers.  The cover features different photos and the front and back, taken by German photographer Klaus Köhler.  Most likely, this compilation was released a year or two prior to 1973.

All tracks written by Barry, Maurice and Robin except where noted, followed by original album inclusion of tracks not included in the original track listing above

Side 1
   "Let There Be Love"
   "I.O.I.O."
   "Don't Forget To Remember"
   "Saved By The Bell" (Robin Gibb)
   "Lamplight" (from Odessa)
   "One Million Years" (Robin Gibb, Robin Gibb solo single, October 1969)

Side 2
   "August October" (Robin Gibb, from Robin's Reign)
   "Sweetheart" (from Cucumber Castle)
   "Railroad" (Maurice Gibb, Maurice Gibb solo single, April 1970)
   "I'll Kiss Your Memory" (Barry Gibb, Barry Gibb solo single, May 1970)
   "Lonely Days"
   "Tomorrow Tomorrow" (Single, May 1969)

References

1973 greatest hits albums
Bee Gees compilation albums
Polydor Records compilation albums
Albums recorded at IBC Studios
Albums produced by Barry Gibb
Albums produced by Robin Gibb
Albums produced by Maurice Gibb
Albums produced by Robert Stigwood